Kateřina Šafránková (born 8 June 1989 in Kolín) is a Czech hammer thrower. She competed in the hammer throw event at the 2012 Summer Olympics. On May 20, 2016, she broke the national record in Ostrava with 72,34 m.  She later beat that record with a mark of 72.47 in Kolin.

Competition record

References

1989 births
Living people
Sportspeople from Kolín
Czech female hammer throwers
Olympic athletes of the Czech Republic
Athletes (track and field) at the 2012 Summer Olympics
Athletes (track and field) at the 2016 Summer Olympics
World Athletics Championships athletes for the Czech Republic
Czech Athletics Championships winners
Competitors at the 2011 Summer Universiade
21st-century Czech women